Babu Chalamala from MEMC Electronic Materials, Inc., St. Peters, MO was named Fellow of the Institute of Electrical and Electronics Engineers (IEEE) in 2014 for contributions to the development of advanced materials and device technologies for vacuum microelectronics and field emission displays.

Babu Chalamala is Head of the Energy Storage Technology and Systems Department and Program Manager for Grid Energy Storage. Prior to joining Sandia in 2015, he was a Corporate Fellow at MEMC - Monsanto Electronic Materials Company where he led R&D and product development in energy storage technology. Before that, he had founding roles in two startup ventures commercializing large format lithium batteries and digital x-ray sources. Earlier, as a research staff member at Motorola and Texas Instruments, he made significant contributions to vacuum microelectronics and flat panel display technologies.

He is a Fellow of the IEEE, AAAS, National Academy of Inventors and the Academy of Sciences St Louis, and a member of the Materials Research Society and the Electrochemical Society. He currently serves as Chair of the IEEE PES Energy Storage and Stationary Battery Committee and as a member of the IEEE PES Industry Technical Leadership Support Committee. An active member of the Materials Research Society, he served as General Chair of the 2006 MRS Fall Meeting and on all Operating Committees of the society. He served on the editorial boards of the Proceedings of the IEEE, IEEE Access, Journal of Display Technology, MRS Bulletin, and Energy Storage Journal. He currently serves as a Senior Editor of IEEE Access. He received his B.Tech degree in Electronics and Communications Engineering from Sri Venkateswara University and his PhD degree in Physics from the University of North Texas. He authored over 120 papers and received 9 US patents.

References 

Fellow Members of the IEEE
Living people
Year of birth missing (living people)